The 1936–1937 SM-Sarja Season was played between 4 Teams from 3 cities. Each team played 6 games each and the best ranking team wins the championship. This season there was no relegation.

SM-Sarja Championship 

Ilves Wins the 1936–37 SM-Sarja championship.

References
 Hockey Archives

Liiga seasons
Fin
1936–37 in Finnish ice hockey